Didimbo is a town in south-east Angola.

Populated places in Cuando Cubango Province